The 2015–16 Illinois Fighting Illini women's basketball team will represent University of Illinois at Urbana–Champaign during the 2015–16 NCAA Division I women's basketball season. The Fighting Illini, led by fourth year head coach Matt Bollant, play their home games at the State Farm Center and are members of the Big Ten Conference. In November 2015, Parkland College in Champaign, Illinois will host Illinois Fighting Illini women's basketball for five games while renovations to the State Farm Center was completed. They finished the season 9–21, 2–16 in Big Ten play to finish in last place. They lost in the first round of the Big Ten women's tournament to Penn State.

Roster

Schedule

|-
!colspan=9 style="background:#FF6600; color:#003C7D;"| Exhibition

|-
!colspan=9 style="background:#FF6600; color:#003C7D;"| Non-conference regular season

|-
!colspan=9 style="background:#FF6600; color:#003C7D;"| Big Ten regular season

|-
!colspan=9 style="background:#FF6600;"| Big Ten Women's Tournament

See also
2015–16 Illinois Fighting Illini men's basketball team

References

Illinois Fighting Illini women's basketball seasons
Illinois
Fight
Fight